Lake George Township may refer to:

Lake George Township, Hubbard County, Minnesota
Lake George Township, Stearns County, Minnesota
Lake George Township, McHenry County, North Dakota, in McHenry County, North Dakota
Lake George Township, Charles Mix County, South Dakota, in Charles Mix County, South Dakota

Township name disambiguation pages